Ariogala Manor is a former residential manor in Raseiniai district, close to Ariogala city.

References

Manor houses in Lithuania